This is a list of black anthropologists.

See also 
 List of anthropologists
 List of women anthropologists

References

.
Anthropologists
African-American social scientists
Anthropologists
Anthropologists, black